Ursula Holliger, née Hänggi, (8 June 1937 – 21 January 2014) was a Swiss harpist, known for her commitment to contemporary music.

Career 
Born in Basel, Holliger studied at the Basel Academy and then at the Conservatoire de Bruxelles. She subsequently went on to pursue a solo career, alone or with her husband, oboist, conductor and composer, Heinz Holliger.

She was one of the most important harpists, particularly in the field of contemporary music, where she played and created many works dedicated to her or her husband: Elliott Carter (Trilogy, 1992; Mosaic, 2004), Alberto Ginastera (Concerto), Henze's Double concerto, 1966), André Jolivet (Controversia, 1969), Witold Lutosławski's Double Concerto, 1980), Ernst Křenek (Kitharaulos, 1972), Frank Martin's Petite symphonie concertante, 1945), Alfred Schnittke (Concerto for oboe and harp, 1970 Eucalypts I, 1970), Isang Yun (Double concerto for oboe and harp, Gong-Hu, In balance, 1987), Tōru Takemitsu (Concerto for oboe and harp) and Heinz Holliger (Mobile, 1962; Trio, 1966; Praeludium I et II 1987). 

She performed, among others, under the direction of Michael Gielen, Pierre Boulez, Simon Rattle, André Previn, Neville Marriner and Heinz Holliger. In the classical repertoire, she has played with flutists Peter-Lukas Graf and Aurèle Nicolet for Mozart's concerto or works by Spohr; and in chamber music, she formed a harp duet with harpist Catherine Einsenhoffer and a regular duet with violinist Hanna Weinmaster.

As a teacher, she taught at the Hochschule für Musik Freiburg and in Basel.

Discography 
Ursula Holliger has recorded for Accord, Camerata, Philips, Deutsche Grammophon/Archiv, Claves Records, Néos et Novalis.

 Haendel's  Concerto for harp in B-flat major, HWV 294 - I Musici (October 1970, Philips 462 179-2) 
 Lutosławski's Concerto for oboe and harp (Philips) 
 Saudades: Ginastera's Concerto for harp - Kammerorchester Serenata Basel, dir. Johannes Schlaefli (September 1992, Pan Classics) 
 Chefs-d'œuvre français pour harpe: André Caplet; Claude Debussy; Maurice Ravel; - Ursula Holliger, harp; Peter-Lukas Graf, flute; Serge Collot, viola; Hans Rudolf Stalder, clarinette; Kammermusiker Zurich (Claves) 
 Recital for two harps: Franck; Debussy; Fauré; Schumann (29-30 April and 26-27 June 1995, Claves) 
 Inner song: chamber music: Elliott Carter (Trilogy) (1997, Philips)

References

External links 
 Official Website
 Ursula Hollinger's discography on Discogs
 Ursula Hollinger on Contrechamps
 Recital for two Harps - Ursula Holliger & C. Eisenhoffer - C. Franck: Prelude, Fugue & Variation on YouTube

1937 births
Musicians from Basel-Stadt
2014 deaths
Swiss harpists
Royal Conservatory of Brussels alumni
Academic staff of the Hochschule für Musik Freiburg